Bang Son Station is a railway station located in Bang Sue Subdistrict, Bang Sue District, Bangkok. Passengers can transfer to the Bang Son MRT Station. Bang Son Station serves two systems operated by the State Railway of Thailand, the Southern Line at the at-grade railway halt and the Bang Son-Taling Chan SRT Light Red Line at the elevated station.

References 
 
 

Railway stations in Thailand